Permit is a 1979 Pakistani Punjabi action musical film directed by Imtiaz Quraish and produced by Javed Ashraf

Cast

Soundtrack

References

External links 
 

Pakistani action films
Pakistani crime films
1979 films
Punjabi-language Pakistani films
Nigar Award winners
Pakistani black-and-white films
1970s Punjabi-language films